Dave Triplett (born c. 1950) is a former American football coach.  He served as the head football coach at the University of South Dakota from 1979 to 1988, compiling a record of 70–45.  Triplett played college football at the University of Iowa, from which he graduated in 1972.  He began his coaching career in 1972 as head football coach at Assumption High School in Davenport, Iowa, where he served for two seasons with a record of 10–7.  He moved to Bishop Heelan Catholic High School in Sioux City, Iowa in 1974, coaching his teams to a 19–2 mark in two seasons and a state championship in 1975.  Triplett joined the college coaching ranks in 1976, working as an assistant coach at Iowa State University for two seasons under head coach Earle Bruce.

Head coaching record

College

References

Year of birth missing (living people)
1950s births
Living people
American football running backs
American football wide receivers
Iowa Hawkeyes football coaches
Iowa Hawkeyes football players
Iowa State Cyclones football coaches
South Dakota Coyotes football coaches
High school football coaches in Iowa
Sportspeople from Des Moines, Iowa
Players of American football from Des Moines, Iowa